The Great Western Railway 4000 or Star were a class of 4-cylinder 4-6-0 passenger steam locomotives designed by George Jackson Churchward for the Great Western Railway (GWR) in 1906 and introduced from early 1907. The prototype was built as a 4-4-2 Atlantic (but converted to 4-6-0 during 1909). They proved to be a successful design which handled the heaviest long-distance express trains, reaching top speeds of 90 mph (145 km/h), and established the design principles for GWR 4-cylinder classes over the next twenty-five years.

Background
After finally converting the last broad gauge lines in 1892, the GWR began a period of modernisation as new cut-off lines shortened its routes to west of England, South Wales and Birmingham. During the first decade of the twentieth century, the new Chief Mechanical Engineer, George Jackson Churchward designed or acquired a number of experimental locomotives with different wheel arrangements and boiler designs to help him plan for the future motive power needs of the railway. Following the success of the prototypes of his two-cylinder Saint class 4-6-0 locomotives, introduced in 1902, Churchward became interested in developing a more powerful 4-cylinder type for the longer non-stop express services. He therefore persuaded the GWR to acquire three French 4-cylinder 4-4-2 compound locomotives, 102 La France (1904) and 103 President and 104 Alliance (both 1905) for comparison purposes.

Prototype

In addition to acquiring the French compound locomotives Churchward built and tested his own prototype 4-cylinder locomotive simple-expansion locomotive, No. 40 North Star in 1906. As with some early members of the Saint class it was built as a 4-4-2 but designed so that it could easily be converted to a 4-6-0. It was completed at the Swindon Works of the GWR (Lot 161) in April 1906. It was numbered 40 and later that year was named 'North Star'. In November 1909 it was converted to 4-6-0. The new design incorporated many ideas from the French locomotives, in particular, the four-cylinder layout, with the inside cylinders placed forward under the smokebox and the outside cylinders placed far back, in line with the rear wheels of the bogie; from this followed the divided drive with the outside cylinders connected to the second set of driving wheels whilst the inside cylinders were connected to the front set of driving wheels. The valve gear was an unusual design, called scissors gear, which eschewed the use of eccentrics, but was basically a variation on Walschaerts gear. The prototype locomotive was rebuilt as a member of the Castle Class in November 1929.

Production series
During initial trials the prototype proved to be largely successful although Charles Rous-Marten commented that 'there were indications that with heavier loads, and less favourable weather, greater adhesion would be needed.' The production series were therefore all built with a 4-6-0 wheel arrangement. They also had inside Walschaerts valve gear rather than the scissors gear. Seven series of what would later be known as 'Star Class' locomotives built between 1907 and 1923 each of which contained detailed differences from the others

Star series

The first series of ten locomotives were built at Swindon in 1907 (Lot 168) numbered 4001–4010 and named after well-known Stars, perpetuating the names of the earlier broad gauge GWR Star Class of 1838. All except for No. 4010 Western Star were built without superheaters. No. 4010 received a 'Swindon No. 1' superheater and the remainder received superheated boilers between August 1909 and October 1912. No. 4009 Shooting Star was rebuilt as a member of the Castle Class in April 1925. The surviving members of the series were withdrawn 1932–1951, although No. 4003 Lode Star was preserved.

Knight series
A second series of ten similar locomotives appeared in 1908 (Swindon Lot 173), with improved bogies, numbered 4011–4020 and named after historical knights. Nos. 4011 was built with a Swindon No. 1 superheater, the remainder were fitted with the standard No.3 superheater between 1909 and 1911. They were withdrawn between 1932 and 1951.

King series

A third series of ten further locomotives appeared during 1909 (Swindon Lot 178), numbered 4021–4030 and named after British Kings. The framing for these had curved ends under the cab and over the cylinders. In June 1909, No. 4021 King Edward was built with a Swindon No. 3 superheater but the remainder had saturated steam boilers until 1910–13. King Edward notably hauled the funeral train for the funeral of King Edward VII on 20 May 1910; the mourners included nine kings and emperors, the largest number of crowned monarchs ever to travel in the same train. The class were all renamed during 1927 to allow for their names to be used on the new King Class. Instead, they were given names of a country followed by the word 'Monarch' (e.g. The Norwegian Monarch). However, several of the names relating to enemy countries were removed during the Second World War (1940-1). They were all withdrawn between 1934 and 1952.

Queen series

A fourth series of ten further locomotives appeared during 1910 and 1911 (Swindon Lot 180). They were numbered 4031–4040 and named after British Queens. This series (and subsequent members of the class) were all built with a Swindon No. 3 superheater. This series was fitted with new style  tenders. Two examples (No. 4032 Queen Alexandra and No. 4037 Queen Philippa) were rebuilt as Castle class locomotives in 1926. The remainder were withdrawn by British Railways between 1950 and 1952.

Prince series
Five further locomotives appeared in 1913 (Swindon Lot 195). Once this was proved to be beneficial, this size gradually became the standard for the class, as they visited the works for their periodic overhaul. The boilers were given top-feed apparatus which also later became standard for the whole class. The locomotives were all withdrawn by British Railways between 1950 and 1953.

Princess series

The GWR experienced a substantial growth in long-distance passenger traffic immediately before the First World War requiring a further series of fifteen locomotives during the first six months of 1914 (Swindon Lot 199). These were numbered 4046–4060 and named after British princesses. They were all built with  diameter cylinders and had improved boilers compared to the previous batch. They also introduced an improved four-cone vacuum ejector made necessary to improve braking on the increasingly long passenger trains. The locomotives were all withdrawn by British Railways between 1950 and 1957.

Abbey series

A final batch of twelve further locomotives appeared in 1922-1923 (Swindon Lot 217). These were numbered 4061–4072 and were named after famous Abbeys in the GWR territory. They were built with improved crank axles. In 1937 Nos. 4063–4072 were all rebuilt as Castle Class locomotives, being renumbered 5083–5092 but retaining their original names. The remaining two locomotives were withdrawn by British Railways in 1956 and 1957.

Trials
The class was criticised in letters to The Engineer for being expensive to build and maintain and Churchward was asked by his Directors to explain why 'the London and North Western Railway could build three 4-6-0 locomotives for the cost of two of his.' His response was 'Because one of mine could pull two of their bloody things backwards'. As a result, there were exchange trials proposed by Churchward with a LNWR Whale Experiment Class during August 1910 which vindicated the Star Class in terms of performance and coal consumption.

Performance
Members of the class performed well as passenger locomotives over all the long-distance routes of the GWR on the fastest express trains and those requiring the longest distance between stops. They gradually became displaced to secondary services by members of the Castle and King classes in the late 1920s and 1930s. Survivors continued to perform well until the mid-1950s. The 4000 class became a template for two later famous GWR 4-cylinder 4-6-0 classes - the Castle and King Class. According to le Fleming "their performance was consistently of the highest standard and they were remarkable free-running engines which rarely suffered breakdown in service. ... No engines were more aptly named than the 'Stars.'"

Modifications
As already noted, between 1925 and 1940 Churchward's successor Charles Collett ordered fifteen examples to be dismantled and their parts used in the construction of new Castle class locomotives.
Throughout their careers the remainder of the class was subject to detailed modifications and improvements to their boilers, smokeboxes, and steam pipes so that "the only period when the appearance of the class was approximately uniform was from 1925 to 1927".  tenders were also fitted from 1938 onwards.

Preservation
One example No. 4003 Lode Star has been preserved, after it was finally withdrawn in 1951, having covered 2,005,898 miles. The locomotive was preserved at Swindon railway works until 1962, then in the Museum of the Great Western Railway until transferred to the National Railway Museum in York in 1992, where it was a static non-working exhibit. In 2010 Lode Star was moved to Steam Museum in Swindon, as a static non-working exhibit. In November 2015, 4003 was moved back to the National Railway Museum.

In August 2022 the Great Western Society's 4709 group bought the GWR 4073 Class 7027 Thornbury Castle, with the intention of using the boiler to recreate a GWR 4700 Class. A few days after the purchase the 4709 group stated that Thornbury Castle's chassis and other components were to be used to recreate a GWR Star class locomotive, and eventually rebuilding it back into Thornbury Castle. However, in September of 2022, those plans were cancelled.

List of locomotives

Accidents and incidents
On 15 April 1923, locomotive No. 4048 Princess Victoria was hauling a freight train that was in a head-on collision with a passenger train at Curry Rivel, Somerset due to a signalman's error. Nine people were injured.

References

Models 
Hornby produce an OO scale model of 4003 Lode Star.

External links 

 4000 'Star' class

4000
4-6-0 locomotives
Railway locomotives introduced in 1907
Standard gauge steam locomotives of Great Britain
2′C h4 locomotives
Passenger locomotives